The London–Aylesbury line is a railway line between London Marylebone and Aylesbury, going via the Chiltern Hills; passenger trains are operated by Chiltern Railways.

The line is part of the former trunk route, the Great Central Main Line.

History

Development of the route
The route towards Aylesbury opened in stages between 1868 and 1899:

 The Metropolitan & St. John's Wood Railway (later part of the Metropolitan Railway) opened from Baker Street to Swiss Cottage in 1868.
 The Aylesbury and Buckingham Railway connected Verney Junction with Aylesbury in 1868. The route would become part of the Met in 1891.
 In 1879 the Met was extended from Swiss Cottage to Willesden Green.
 In 1880 to Harrow -on-the-Hill.
 In 1885 to Pinner.
 In 1887 to Rickmansworth.
 In 1889 to Chesham.
 Then in September 1892 the Metropolitan connected to Aylesbury via Amersham, making the Chesham route a branch line.

The Great Central Railway (GCR) decided to build a main line called the London Extension from Annesley Junction north of Nottingham to London via the Metropolitan Railway. It was the last main line to be built in Britain in the Victorian era. The line was completed in 1899. In 1903 the line between Harrow and Canfield Place (near Finchley Road) was built, thus bypassing this part of the Metropolitan tracks. The route was a major trunk route with many prestigious trains, such as The Master Cutler and The South Yorkshireman.

The line beyond Aylesbury Vale Parkway is currently closed to almost all passenger services: the Metropolitan line service north of Aylesbury to Verney Junction and Brill was withdrawn in 1936 as London Transport (LT) wanted to focus more closely on London.

Electrification
The line north west from Harrow was electrified in stages. In 1925, four rail electrification reached Rickmansworth and Watford, and the Metropolitan Railway planned to electrify the line as far as Aylesbury by 1935. However, when the Met was absorbed into LT the plans were put on hold. Electrification of the final leg of the Met finally got under way in the late 1950s, but LT decided later to electrify only up to Amersham. The original intention to electrify further is evidenced by the colour light signalling which was fully installed as far as Aylesbury and by platform extensions up to Stoke Mandeville. In 1961 LT withdrew the Metropolitan line from Aylesbury and since then it goes only as far as Amersham. Following the end of steam-hauled Metropolitan line trains in 1961 the service was provided by British Rail Class 115 diesel multiple units until 1992 (which were then replaced by the line's current rolling stock) – along with Metropolitan line electric multiple units south of Amersham. The last steam train ran on 17 June 1962 and the timetable from 18 June reduced the London to Aylesbury timings from 90 minutes to 59. Responsibility for the line north of Amersham was transferred from London Transport to British Railways on 11 September 1961; London Underground signage at the stations on this section was gradually replaced by those of British Railways.

Rationalisation from 1960s onwards
The mainline services north of Aylesbury (via Woodford Halse, Rugby and Loughborough to Nottingham Victoria and beyond) were withdrawn in 1966 as the Great Central Main Line was seen by Dr Beeching as a duplicate of the Midland Main Line. Now only freight services to Calvert and on certain Bank Holidays special passenger train service runs to and from Quainton Road. The track remains in situ from Calvert west to Bicester Village and the line to Bletchley is being reconstructed for future reopening as part of East West Rail.

InterCity 125 trains were used on the line, albeit rarely, during the 1980s. Also in the 1980s, there were passenger specials north to Milton Keynes from Marylebone via Aylesbury and High Wycombe, which picked up passengers at Quainton Road and the disused Winslow railway station.

On 14 December 2008, Chiltern Railways opened a new station, Aylesbury Vale Parkway. This station is situated two miles NW of Aylesbury station.

Route description

From Marylebone the line runs through a series of tunnels as far as Finchley Road, from where the line runs overground and runs parallel to the Metropolitan and Jubilee lines. At Neasden Junction, the Chiltern Main Line diverges to the west, while the Aylesbury line continues north parallel to the underground lines. The line then joins the Metropolitan line tracks a few yards south of Harrow-on-the-Hill station and shares this track with the London Underground's fast Metropolitan line services to Amersham from Baker Street. Beyond Moor Park, the line to Watford diverges.

Between Rickmansworth and Chorleywood, the M25 motorway crosses on a viaduct. After Chalfont & Latimer station, the Chesham branch diverges, and the main line continues to Amersham, the terminus for Metropolitan line trains. Beyond Amersham, the line returns to Network Rail control and runs northwest to Aylesbury, following the A413 road.  The Princes Risborough line joins the main line at Aylesbury, where Chiltern Railways have a maintenance depot. There, the line becomes single track, and after Aylesbury Vale Parkway, freight only, passing through Quainton Road to Calvert, the site of a major waste transfer station and landfill site.  Beyond Calvert, at the former junction, the line turns east to join the Varsity Line, while the trackbed of the former Great Central Main Line continues northwest.

London Underground own the track and co-run on the line between Harrow on the Hill and the property boundary north of Amersham.

The line serves the following stations:

London Marylebone
Harrow on the Hill
Rickmansworth
Chorleywood
Chalfont and Latimer
Amersham
Great Missenden
Wendover
Stoke Mandeville
Aylesbury
Aylesbury Vale Parkway
(Quainton Road)

Operation
Passenger services are provided by Chiltern Railways. From Marylebone to Neasden Junction the track is shared with the Chiltern Main Line and from Harrow to Amersham the track is shared with London Underground's Metropolitan line, and is used by their "fast" services. As a result, all Chiltern trains must be fitted with the tripcock braking system to run on Underground lines. Marylebone Signalling Control Centre controls all the signals on the line between Marylebone and south of Harrow, and also from north of Amersham to Aylesbury. Marylebone can see all train movements throughout the line but does not control the signals on the Metropolitan line section. These are operated by London Underground signal cabins at Harrow, Rickmansworth and Amersham. The Network Rail-controlled section of the line is fully equipped with ATP, one of three lines in Britain to have this (the others being the Chiltern Main Line and the Great Western Main Line). As a result, all Chiltern trains must be equipped with ATP equipment.

The line operates lower frequency timetables during autumn as trains need to take more time to brake due to the leaves that fall on the line in the heavily wooded section between Amersham and Rickmansworth.

Weekday off-peak service pattern
:

† – tph = train(s) per hour

Future

Following completion of a major track work project in December 2006, journey times on the line were cut by about 10 minutes. Major track replacement work is under way on the London Underground parts of the line, to increase maximum speeds and reduce delays.
The line north of Aylesbury was reopened to regular passenger traffic in 2008 as far as the new Aylesbury Vale Parkway station. In the long term, the line is to reopen beyond Aylesbury Vale Parkway to allow passenger services to reach  and  via East West Rail.
A proposal announced in March 2010 would have routed the future high speed line, High Speed 2, parallel with a section of the Chiltern Main Line. If this was undertaken, it would have been a non-stop service, with no interconnections with the Chiltern Line.

National Rail passenger volume
These are the passenger usage statistics on the National Rail network from the year beginning April 2002 to the year beginning April 2012. Large increases in the final year in some stations are mainly due to the introduction of Oyster Cards on the National Rail Network. The reason there were no usage figures in the first three years for stations from Amersham to Harrow-on-the-Hill was because these figures were not yet separated from the London Underground figures, who own and share the same tracks at this point. Aylesbury Vale Parkway has no previous data for the first five years as it only opened in 2008.

References

Further reading

Rail transport in Buckinghamshire
Rail transport in Hertfordshire
Railway lines in London
Railway lines in South East England
Standard gauge railways in England
Transport in the London Borough of Brent
Transport in the London Borough of Camden
Transport in the London Borough of Harrow
Transport in the London Borough of Hillingdon
Transport in the City of Westminster
Rickmansworth